Paul Embery is a British author, political commentator, and trade union activist. He has worked as a columnist for UnHerd and Huffington Post, and has hosted The Political Correction segment of GB News. Embery is a member of the Blue Labour campaign movement.

Biography
Embery was born and raised in Dagenham. He served as a firefighter with the London Fire Brigade and was on the executive council of the Fire Brigades Union (FBU), serving as the regional secretary of the Fire Brigades Union in London. He became a member of the Labour Party in 1994.

In March 2019, Embery spoke at the pro-Brexit Leave Means Leave rally in London. As a result, he was dismissed from his role from the Fire Brigades Union and barred from being a Fire Brigades Union official for two years as the FBU stated Embery's decision to speak at the rally violated their anti-Brexit policy. The decision was criticised by politicians Kate Hoey and Jon Cruddas. In August 2021, it was ruled that Embery had been unfairly dismissed from his position.

In 2020, Embery published Despised: Why the Modern Left Loathes the Working Class..

References

British political commentators
British political writers
Living people
Year of birth missing (living people)
People from Dagenham
British trade unionists
British Eurosceptics
Labour Party (UK) people
English socialists
Conservatism in the United Kingdom